The East Porter County School Corporation is the school system that serves Pleasant Township, Morgan Township, and Washington Township, located in Northwest Indiana. These three townships have only one town, that being Kouts.

Schools
 Kouts Middle/High School  (Mustangs)
 Kouts Elementary School

 Morgan Township Middle/High School (Cherokees)
 Morgan Township Elementary School

 Washington Township Middle/High School (Senators)
 Washington Township Elementary School

References

 Official site

Education in Porter County, Indiana
School districts in Indiana
1994 establishments in Indiana
School districts established in 1994